Réal Simard (born 7 January 1951) is a Canadian gangster from Montreal known for being a hitman for Frank Cotroni of the Cotroni crime family, who later turned informant.

Early career
In Simard's early days, he robbed banks with childhood friend Raymond Martel, but Martel was caught in a heist, while Simard avoided arrest. Another bank-robbing accomplice of Simard, Jean-Paul Saint-Armand, was arrested and turned informant, which sentenced Simard to six years in prison. Simard is the nephew of Armand Courville, a long-time associate of Frank Cotroni's older brother Vic Cotroni. While Simard was in prison, he met leader of the family, Frank Cotroni, acting for his brother who was ill with cancer; he would become Frank's driver and eventual hitman upon their release in 1979. Simard considered Frank an uncle figure. By his own admission, a morally weak character who was emotionally needy and felt a desperate need to feel important, Simard stated that he became a hitman for Cotroni because it made feel like he was somebody powerful. Simard stated he found from Cotroni the "love, attention, friendship" that he never experienced in the broken home he had grown up in, adding "I had to take care of him. I was with him everyday. I was protecting him".

Mob hits and turning informant
Simard's first hit was on Michel "Fatso" Marion in January 1980, who was ripping off Frank's rackets. Simard killed Marion while he was eating breakfast at a diner, giving the coup de grâce on Frank's order. Simard carried out another hit later that year. In June 1981, Simard murdered Giuseppe Montegano, a low-level cocaine dealer in Montreal, at Frank's son Francesco's private club, as he was suspected of being police informant and had hostilities with Francesco. Simard then killed Michel Pozza in his driveway while he waited for him to come home in September 1982; Pozza was a reputed money launderer for the Cotroni family, but could no longer be trusted after shifting allegiance to the Sicilian Rizzuto crime family.

In July 1983, Simard moved to Ontario where he met with Johnny Papalia in Hamilton on behalf of Frank Cotroni. Simard seized the Ontario market, bringing Quebec strippers to Toronto clubs, where he allowed Papalia to put his pinball machines in his clubs. He became known as "David". Simard has been linked with Toronto mobster Paul Volpe's November 1983 murder, but no charges were laid. Also in November 1983, Simard and associate Richard Clément killed Mario Héroux, but unknowingly only severely wounded Robert Hétu, in their Toronto hotel room after they conspired to kill Clément. Hétu testified against Simard and Simard was arrested and convicted, until he became informant against Frank Cotroni and the family; this resulted in an eight-year sentence for manslaughter against Frank, Francesco and two associates in 1987 for the Montegano murder.

Life after the Mafia
To reward him for his testimony, the Crown ensured that in prison Simard had his own cell complete with a microwave, telephone, an exercise bike and a TV, giving by the standards of Canadian prisons a very luxurious lifestyle. After being released on early parole in 1990, Simard went into witness protection as the Cotroni family had put a price on his life. In his 1987 biography, Le Neveu (The Nephew), Simard told the book's author, Michel Vastel, that he was deeply moved by reading in French translation Out of a Limb by the American actress Shirley MacLaine, which convinced him that he had a soul and of the reality of reincarnation. Simard stated: "Whatever action one takes will ultimately return to that person-good or bad-maybe not in this life embodiment, but sometime in the future. And nobody is exempt". 

In a television documentary produced by Vastel about Simard, one reviewer wrote that Simard "has the charm of a gigolo and looks like a cross between heartthrob actor Armand Assante and singer Gino Vannelli." After being admitted on day parole in 1990 followed by full parole in 1994, Simard became active in Quebec separatism, serving as the campaign manager for a Bloc Quebecois candidate in the 1993 election. Subsequently, Simard turned to welfare fraud to support himself, cheating the Quebec government of some $13,000, which led to his parole being revoked. After being arrested in 1999 on charges of welfare fraud, Simard escaped and was discovered in 2004 to be working as a security guard at the Collège Jean-de-Brébeuf, one of the most prestigious Catholic private schools in Quebec. Simard went back to prison for violating his parole for committing welfare fraud in 2004, and his attempts for parole have since been consistently refused by the parole board.

Further reading
Vastel, Michel and Simard, Réal. The Nephew: The Making of a Mafia Hitman. Doubleday Canada, Limited, 1989.

References

Books
Auger, Michel & Edwards, Peter The Encyclopedia of Canadian Organized Crime: From Captain Kidd to Mom Boucher, Toronto: McClelland & Stewart, 2012, 

1951 births
Living people
20th-century Canadian criminals
Canadian male criminals
Canadian gangsters
Criminals from Montreal
Police informants
Mafia hitmen
French Quebecers
Cotroni crime family
Organized crime in Montreal
Canadian prisoners and detainees
Prisoners and detainees of Canada